Thestor pictus, the Langeberg skolly, is a butterfly of the family Lycaenidae. It is found in South Africa, where it is found in fynbos-covered mountain slopes above Garcia's Pass on the Langeberg.

The wingspan is 26–28 mm for males and 27–29 mm for females. Adults are on wing from the end of September to November, with a peak in October. There is one generation per year.

Larvae have been found in the nests of the pugnacious ant Anoplolepis custodiens, but the larval food is unknown.

References

Butterflies described in 1941
Thestor
Endemic butterflies of South Africa